Lilia Izquierdo Aguirre (born February 10, 1967 in Havana, Cuba) is a former female volleyball player from Cuba. She won gold medals at the Summer Olympics in 1992, 1996 and 2000.

References
 databaseOlympics

1967 births
Living people
Cuban women's volleyball players
Volleyball players at the 1992 Summer Olympics
Volleyball players at the 1996 Summer Olympics
Volleyball players at the 2000 Summer Olympics
Olympic volleyball players of Cuba
Olympic gold medalists for Cuba
Sportspeople from Havana
Olympic medalists in volleyball
Medalists at the 2000 Summer Olympics
Medalists at the 1996 Summer Olympics
Medalists at the 1992 Summer Olympics
Pan American Games medalists in volleyball
Pan American Games gold medalists for Cuba
Pan American Games silver medalists for Cuba
Medalists at the 1987 Pan American Games
Medalists at the 1991 Pan American Games
Medalists at the 1995 Pan American Games
Medalists at the 1999 Pan American Games
21st-century Cuban women
20th-century Cuban women